Listening Booth: 1970 is the fifth studio album by American singer-songwriter Marc Cohn, released in 2010.

The album was a collection of Cohn's favorite songs from 1970, when he was aged 11. He explained: "It was the beginning of me really falling in love with records and albums and becoming obsessed as a fan. I was a little kid dreaming to find a way to make that a career, and that was the music that started me on that path." He said he was determined to put his own stamp on each song: "For me, it's like what's the use of doing something that was initially brilliant and well known if you don't have anything to bring to it."

The one song on the album not originally released in 1970 was The Box Tops' 1967 hit "The Letter". Cohn said the song was included on the basis of Joe Cocker's 1970 version.

Track listing

Personnel 
 Marc Cohn – lead vocals
 John Leventhal – keyboards, organ, guitars, bass (1-5, 7-12), percussion 
 Rich Hinman – pedal steel guitar (9)
  Tim Luntzel – upright bass (6)
 Dan Rieser – drums (1, 2, 4, 5, 7, 8, 9, 11)
 Shawn Pelton – drums (3, 10)
 Rick Depofi – percussion, horns
 India.Arie – lead vocal ("Make It With You")
 Kristina Train – harmony vocal ("The Tears of a Clown")
 Aimee Mann – harmony vocal ("No Matter What")
 Jim Lauderdale – harmony vocal ("New Speedway Boogie")
 Kenny Williams – harmony vocal ("The Letter"), backing vocal ("Maybe I'm Amazed")
 Curtis King – backing vocal ("Maybe I'm Amazed")
 James "D-Train" Williams – backing vocal ("Maybe I'm Amazed")

Production 
 John Leventhal – producer, arrangements, mixing 
 Rick Depofi – co-producer, engineer, mixing 
 Mike Jason – executive producer 
 Bas Hartong – A&R 
 Reuben Cohen – mastering 
 Gavin Lurssen – mastering 
 Karen Malluk – project manager
 Susan Winslow – project manager
 Gail Marowitz – art direction, design 
 Jennifer Tzar – photography 
 Olivia Kim – editorial research
 Marc Cohn – liner notes

References

Marc Cohn albums
2010 albums
Albums produced by John Leventhal